Daniel James Pinter (born June 19, 1996) is an American football center for the Indianapolis Colts of the National Football League (NFL). He played college football at Ball State.

College career
Coming out of Adams High School, located in his hometown of South Bend, Indiana, Pinter was recruited to Ball State to play tight end. He transitioned to offensive tackle as a sophomore. After his senior season, he was named Ball State's most outstanding player. He was an All-Mid-American Conference first-team honoree. Pinter played in the 2020 NFLPA Collegiate Bowl in Pasadena, California.

Professional career

Pinter was selected by the Indianapolis Colts with the 149th overall pick in the fifth round of the 2020 NFL Draft.

Pinter got his first playing time as a rookie at center on September 26, 2020 against the New York Jets when the Colts relieved the left side of their starting offensive line once victory was imminent.

Pinter caught his first career NFL touchdown in a Thursday Night Football game vs the New York Jets from Carson Wentz on November 04, 2021.

References

External links
Ball State Cardinals bio

1996 births
Living people
Players of American football from South Bend, Indiana
American football offensive tackles
American football offensive guards
Ball State Cardinals football players
Indianapolis Colts players